The 2018 Open Sopra Steria de Lyon was a professional tennis tournament played on clay courts. It was the 3rd edition of the tournament which was part of the 2018 ATP Challenger Tour. It took place in Lyon, France, between 11 and 17 June 2018.

Singles main-draw entrants

Seeds

 1 Rankings are as of 28 May 2018.

Other entrants
The following players received wildcards into the singles main draw:
  Elliot Benchetrit
  Corentin Moutet
  Alexandre Müller
  Alexei Popyrin

The following players received entry from the qualifying draw:
  Tristan Lamasine
  Roberto Marcora
  Johan Tatlot
  Mikael Ymer

Champions

Singles

 Félix Auger-Aliassime def.  Johan Tatlot 6–7(3–7), 7–5, 6–2.

Doubles

 Elliot Benchetrit /  Geoffrey Blancaneaux def.  Hsieh Cheng-peng /  Luca Margaroli 6–3, 4–6, [10–7].

External links
Official Website

2018 ATP Challenger Tour
2018
2018 in French tennis